Mangal Prabhat is a book by Mahatma Gandhi. It was published posthumously in 1958 with the preface written by Dattatreya Balkrishna Kalelkar.

Origin and publication history
Gandhi used to deliver a speech on the Ashram vows every Tuesday after prayers. These speeches later compiled by Narandas Gandhi and was published as a book Mangal Prabhat in 1958.

Summary
Mangal Prabhat discusses the eleven vows taken by Gandhi in detail.

Translation
The book was translated into Hindi by Amritlal Thakordas Nanavaty. It was also adapted into verse in Marathi language and was titles Abhang Vraten.

References

Further reading
 हिन्द स्वराज के 'शिक्षा' अध्याय व 'मंगल प्रभात' के परिपेक्ष्य में 'निति शिक्षा' की संकल्पना व उसका समाधान : गुणात्मक व दार्शनिक अध्ययन
 Gautam Buddha ane Mahatma Gandhiji Prerit Naitik Mulyo Tulnatmak Adhyayan Dhammapad ane Mangalprabhat Ekadashvrat na Sandarbhman

External links

 Mangal Prabhat
 Mangal Prabhat Internet Archive
 Audio book on Internet Archive

1958 non-fiction books
Gujarati-language books
20th-century Indian books
Literature about spirituality
Mahatma Gandhi